Randall Jai Miller (born January 17, 1985) is an American former professional baseball outfielder. He played in Major League Baseball (MLB) for three seasons with the Florida Marlins, Kansas City Royals, and Oakland Athletics. He played for the University of Alabama Crimson Tide as a walk-on defensive back on their football team.

Baseball career

Florida Marlins
Miller was drafted out of high school by the Florida Marlins in the 4th round (113th overall) of the 2003 Major League Baseball draft. He made his professional career debut that year for the Single-A Jamestown Jammers, playing in 11 games and batting .233 with no home runs.

In 2004, Miller played for the Single-A Greensboro Bats. In 113 games, he batted .205 with 12 home runs. He basically put up the same stats in 2005, playing for the Single-A Greensboro Grasshoppers (the team changed their name after the 2004 season). In 115 games, he batted .207 with 13 home runs.

Miller played for the Single-A Jupiter Hammerheads in 2006. He batted .208 but his home run production dropped, producing no home runs for the Hammerheads in 2006.

In 2007, he moved up a level, playing for the Double-A Carolina Mudcats. For the Mudcats, he set career highs in batting average (.261), home runs (14), RBI's (58), games played (129), hits (106) and doubles (26).

Miller made his big league debut with Florida in 2008 and went 0-for-1 in just one ballgame.

On November 20, 2009, the Marlins purchased his contract, protecting him from the Rule 5 draft. He was later designated for assignment on April 3, 2010.

Oakland Athletics
The Oakland Athletics claimed him on waivers April 8, 2010 and optioned him to the Triple-A Sacramento River Cats. Fourteen days later he was designated for assignment.

Kansas City Royals
And on April 26, 2010, he was acquired off waivers by the Kansas City Royals.

As a Royal in 2010 he got his first major league hit, a single, against the Detroit Tigers. Total, Miller played 20 games with the Royals, hitting 1 HR, 4 RBIs and a .236 Avg.

Oakland Athletics
On December 17, 2010 The Oakland Athletics once again signed Miller, this time as a free agent. He spent nearly the entire 2011 season with Triple-A Sacramento River Cats, batting .276 with 32 homers and 88 RBIs in 110 games.

On September 11, 2011 Miller was called up to join the Oakland Athletics.  He played in 7 games, hitting 1 HR, 2 RBIs and a .250 Avg.

On December 23, Miller was designated for assignment to make room for the prospects acquired in the Gio González trade.

Baltimore Orioles
He was traded to the Baltimore Orioles on January 3. On October 6, 2012 Miller elected free agency.

Return to college
On January 7, 2013, Miller announced his intention to play football with the University of Alabama.

References

External links

Rotoworld profile
Bio at RollTide.com

1985 births
Living people
Florida Marlins players
Kansas City Royals players
Oakland Athletics players
Baseball players from Alabama
African-American baseball players
Major League Baseball outfielders
Gulf Coast Marlins players
Jamestown Jammers players
Greensboro Bats players
Greensboro Grasshoppers players
Jupiter Hammerheads players
Carolina Mudcats players
Albuquerque Isotopes players
New Orleans Zephyrs players
Sacramento River Cats players
Omaha Royals players
Norfolk Tides players
Bowie Baysox players
Alabama Crimson Tide football players
American football defensive backs
Sportspeople from Auburn, Alabama
21st-century African-American sportspeople
20th-century African-American people